Wunstorf is a railway station located in Wunstorf, Germany. The station opened in 1847 and is located on the Hanover–Minden railway and Bremen–Hanover railway. The train services are operated by Deutsche Bahn and WestfalenBahn. The station is also served by the Hanover S-Bahn.

A  single-track spur runs to Bokeloh. It is used exclusively by freight trains operated by Osthannoversche Eisenbahnen (OHE), serving a former potash mine.

Train services
The following services currently call at the station:

Regional services  Norddeich - Emden - Oldenburg - Bremen - Nienburg - Hanover
Regional services  Bremerhaven-Lehe - Bremen - Nienburg - Hanover
Regional services  Rheine - Osnabrück - Minden - Hannover - Braunschweig
Regional services  Bielefeld - Minden - Hannover - Braunschweig
Hannover S-Bahn services  Minden - Haste - Wunstorf - Hanover - Weetzen - Haste
Hannover S-Bahn services  Nienburg - Wunstorf - Hanover - Weetzen - Haste

References

Railway stations in Lower Saxony
Hannover S-Bahn stations